Events in the year 2002 in the Antarctica.

Events 
Members of the Antarctic Treaty System officially adopt a new emblem, which would go on to be used as the flag that represented Antarctica occasionally, however; this emblem represents the Antarctic Treaty and not the continent itself.

In the first three months of the year, the 3,250 square kilometer (1,250 square mile) Larsen B Ice Shelf splintered and collapsed.

References 

2002 in Antarctica
Years of the 21st century in Antarctica
Antarctica